The 2012 Total 24 Hours of Spa was the 65th running of the 24 Hours of Spa. It was the fourth round of the 2012 Blancpain Endurance Series season and was held over the 28 and 29 of July at the Circuit de Spa-Francorchamps in Belgium. The race was won by Andrea Piccini, Rene Rast and Frank Stippler driving an Audi.

Entry List
On 4 July, the RACB and SRO Belgium released the provisional entry list.

Qualifying

Race
Class winners in bold.  Cars failing to complete 70% of winner's distance marked as Not Classified (NC).

References

Spa 24 Hours
Spa
Spa